Peletier may refer to:

Peletier, North Carolina
Peletier Plateau
Peletier (surname)

See also
Pelletier (disambiguation)